Limakatso Alfonsina Koloi is a South African politician. A member of the African National Congress, she is currently serving as a Member of the Northern Cape Provincial Legislature. She took office as an MPL on 22 May 2019. She is the Deputy Chair of Chairs and the Chairperson of the Portfolio Committee on Co-operative Governance, Human Settlements and Traditional Affairs. Koloi was previously the Executive Mayor of the Dawid Kruiper Local Municipality.

References

External links
Profile : Mr Limakatso Alfonsina Koloi – NCPLEG
Limakatso Alfonsina Koloi – People's Assembly

Living people
People from the Northern Cape
African National Congress politicians
Members of the Northern Cape Provincial Legislature
People from Upington
Year of birth missing (living people)